Derek Porter (born 22 June 1936) is an English former footballer who played for Barrow and Wigan Athletic. Porter made three appearances for Wigan in the 1959–60 season of the Lancashire Combination.

References

External links

1936 births
Living people
People from Ulverston
English footballers
Association football wingers
English Football League players
Barrow A.F.C. players
Wigan Athletic F.C. players
Footballers from Cumbria